Samuel Claridge (December 5, 1828 – September 11, 1919) was a member of the Church of Jesus Christ of Latter-day Saints (LDS Church) who was a prominent early settler of the Muddy River Valley in Nevada and Thatcher, Arizona.

Claridge was born in Leighton Buzzard, Bedfordshire, England, to David Claridge and Elizabeth Pratt Hopkins. In 1849, he married Charlotte Joy and in 1851 they joined the LDS Church. In 1853, they emigrated to Utah Territory, settling in Nephi. In 1868, Wilford Woodruff appointed Claridge to preside over the Latter-day Saints living along the Muddy River in Nevada (then in Utah Territory). The eastern border of Nevada was later shifted east, and with the attempt to charge back taxes to those living there, the Latter-day Saints moved away. Claridge moved to Kane County, Utah.

In 1875, Claridge was one of the founders of Orderville, Utah. He left his wife and children there in 1877 to serve a church mission in Britain. After his mission, Claridge lived in Orderville until he moved to Thatcher, Arizona, in 1883. He served as the bishop of the Thatcher Ward and later as the first patriarch of the St. Joseph Stake, which was headquartered at Thatcher. Among those who received patriarchal blessings from him was Spencer W. Kimball.

Claridge's daughter, Elizabeth (1852–1924), was the wife of Alfred William McCune, Sr. (1849–1927) and a prominent benefactor of the operations of the LDS Church in the 1920s.

S. George Ellsworth, a grandson of Claridge, wrote a biography of Claridge titled Samuel Claridge: Pioneering the Outposts of Zion.  Claridge's daughter, Charlotte "Lottie", married Brigham Young III, a son of Brigham Young, Jr. and his wife Catherine Curtis Spencer.<ref>[https://books.google.com/books?id=67U3AQAAIAAJ&dq=Edith+Grant+Young&pg=RA1-PA44 Susa Young Gates, Genealogy of the Family of Brigham Young"], Utah Genealogical Magazine: "some have incorrectly said that Lottie's husband was Brigham Spencer Young, but Brigham Spencer Young was actually the name of one of her sons"</ref>  One of Claridge's sons, David Claridge, was a member of the Arizona House of Representatives.

Notes

References
 
 Utah State University bio on Claridge
 review of Ellsworth's biography of Claridge, BYU Studies''

External links

 

1828 births
1919 deaths
19th-century Mormon missionaries
American Latter Day Saints
British Latter Day Saints
Converts to Mormonism
English Latter Day Saints
English Mormon missionaries
English emigrants to the United States
English leaders of the Church of Jesus Christ of Latter-day Saints
Mormon missionaries in the United Kingdom
Mormon pioneers
Patriarchs (LDS Church)
People from Clark County, Nevada
People from Kane County, Utah
People from Leighton Buzzard
People from Nephi, Utah
People from Thatcher, Arizona